Mardi Gras Casino and Resort is a casino and greyhound racing venue located in the city of Nitro, West Virginia.  It is located just off the Cross Lanes exit of I-64, 14 miles west of Charleston, West Virginia and 36 miles east of Huntington, West Virginia. Although it is located within the city of Nitro, it is served by the neighboring Cross Lanes post office.

It features table games, slot machines, live greyhound racing, and off-track betting for both greyhound and horse racing.  It also features several restaurants, food operations and a 150-room luxury hotel.  The facility has a Mardi Gras theme.

The track expanded its casino offerings in 2008, as casino gambling was legalized in 2007.  It currently has a large poker room, and offers the table games of blackjack, roulette, craps, three card poker, Mississippi stud, and 
Crisscross Poker.

The casino was known as Tri-State Racetrack and Gaming Center when it first opened in 1985, before the addition of table games, and Tri-State Casino and Resort until the name was changed to reflect its Mardi Gras theme in July 2010.

In March 2018, Hartman & Tyner sold the property to Delaware North, the owner of the state's only other greyhound racing track, Wheeling Island Hotel-Casino-Racetrack. As of the start of 2023, they are the only two remaining greyhound venues in the United States.

See also
List of casinos in West Virginia 
List of casino hotels

References

External links
 

Buildings and structures in Kanawha County, West Virginia
Casinos in West Virginia
Resorts in West Virginia
Tourist attractions in Kanawha County, West Virginia
Greyhound racing venues in the United States